I Was Raised On Matthew, Mark, Luke & Laura is the debut full-length album released by the band PAS/CAL.

Track listing

"The Truth Behind All the Vogues She Sold" – 4:38
"You Were Too Old for Me" – 6:01
"We Made Our Way, We Amtrakked" – 5:39
"Summer Is Almost Here" – 3:40
"Glorious Ballad of the Ignored" – 4:52
"O Honey We're Ridiculous" – 3:35
"Dearest Bernard Living" – 5:19
"Little Red Radio" – 3:04
"Suite Cherry: Cherry Needs a Name" – 2:19
"Suite Cherry: Cherry Tree" – 1:28
"Suite Cherry: Oh My Cherry" – 5:36
"Citizens Army Uniform" – 5:36

References

External links
Listen to full LP on Bandcamp
LP reviewed by NPR
LP reviewed in Paste Magazine
LP reviewed by Pitchfork
LP reviewed by Junkmedia
LP reviewed by Amplifier Magazine
LP reviewed by 30music
LP reviewed in San Antonio Current
LP reviewed by Donnybrook Writing Academy
LP reviewed by The Yellow Stereo
LP reviewed by New York's Metromix
LP reviewed by OC Weekly
LP reviewed by Sydsvenskan.se
LP reviewed in Beyond Race Magazine
LP reviewed by Are Seven
LP reviewed by Good Night Believer
LP reviewed by forskinnysteve

2008 debut albums
PAS/CAL albums
Le Grand Magistery albums